Ceroprepes fartakensis is a species of snout moth in the genus Ceroprepes. It was described by Rebel in 1931, and is known from Arabia.

References

Moths described in 1931
Phycitinae